Market Common may refer to:

Market Common Clarendon in Arlington, Virginia
The Market Common in Myrtle Beach, South Carolina

See also
Common Market (disambiguation)